Montserrat Bajet Royo (born 1945, Barcelona) is a professor and Spanish historian.

Biography 
Licensed in Philosophy, specialising in modern history, at the University of Barcelona. In 1993, she got her PhD in law at the University of Lleida with a thesis on the "Mostassaf" of Barcelona and its functions in the 16th century, an edition of "El Llibre de les Ordenations" (What is it?). The book was published by the Noguera Foundation in 1994 in the collection "Textos y Documentos" (Texts and Documents). She began her professional career as professor in the department of History of Law, run by Dr. Tomás de Montagut, at the Pompeu Fabra University in Barcelona as associated professor, then as lecturer, and finally as professor.

Bajet's main lines of investigation, which include most of her publications, are of the history of municipal institutions of Catalonia, especially those of the city of Barcelona and the ius proprium (law) in Catalonia. She is the author of the first transcription and publication of the manuscripts (IMH, L-72) and (IMH, MS.47) conserved in the Historic Archive of the City of Barcelona.

Publications 

 Bajet, Montserrat (1993). Aspectes del comerç a Catalunya en el segle XVI segons els llibres dels mostassas. University of Lleida. . . Accessed 2 March 2021.
 Bajet i Royo, Montserrat (1994). El mostassaf de Barcelona i les seves funcions en el segle XVI : edició del "Llibre de les ordinations". Fundació Noguera. .  . Accessed 2 March 2021.
 Bajet i Royo, Montserrat (2003). Policia de mercat a l'època medieval (en Catalan). Societat Catalana d'Estudis Jurídics. . Accessed 2 March 2021.
 Bajet i Royo, Montserrat (2009). El jurament i el seu significat jurídic al principat segons el dret general de Catalunya (segles XIII-XVIII) : edició de la "Forma i pràctica de celebrar els juraments i les eleccions a la ciutat de Barcelona en el segle XV". Barcelona: Universitat Pompeu Fabra. . . Accessed 2 March 2021.

References

External links 

 Portal of Scientific Produccion of the UPF (Portal de Producció Científica de la UPF)
 «Montserrat Bajet Royo» on Dialnet

1945 births
Living people
Spanish women historians
20th-century Spanish historians
21st-century Spanish historians
Academic staff of Pompeu Fabra University